Musica Nova (Latin for "New Music") may refer to:

Publications and compositions
Musica Nova a musical collection Venice, 1540, with ricercars of Julio Segni and Willaert with Girolamo Cavazzoni, Girolamo Parabosco
Musica Nova (Venice 1559), Adrian Willaert's own collection of motets and madrigals published by Antonio Gardano
Musica Nova (Leipzig 1626), Johann Hermann Schein

Festivals and forums
Frau musica nova, a conference held in November 1998 in Cologne, Germany
Musica Nova Prize in Prague, won by Robert Scott Thompson 2003 and others
Musica Nova Festival, São Paulo
Pro Musica Nova, musical forum and Bremen radio festival founded by Hans Otte
Musica Nova Festival, Glasgow, directed by Matthias Bamert
Grupo Música Nova Brazilian modernist movement founded by Gilberto Mendes
:pt:Festival Música Nova Brazilian festival founded by Gilberto Mendes
Musica Nova, 1989, a later Brazilian modernist group founded by Marisa Rezende
Musica Nova Editions of Brazil. directed by Marlos Nobre
Musica Nova, program on Dutch Radio 4 presented by Ton Hartsuiker
Musica Nova - Sofia, international festival founded by Georgi Tutev
Musica Nova Festival in Munich
Musica nova sacra, Frank Michael Beyer
Musica Nova Helsinki festival

Ensembles
"Musica Nova" contemporary music ensemble of Eastman School of Music Rochester
Musica Nova chamber orchestra in Bucharest founded by Hilda Jerea
Musica Nova (French ensemble), led by Lucien Kandel
Musica Nova Consort, Givataim, a breakout group from the Israel Philharmonic Orchestra founded in 1985 led by Leonty Wolf